Latour-de-Carol-Enveitg (Catalan: La Tor de Querol-Enveig) or Latour-de-Carol is a railway station in Enveitg and Latour-de-Carol, Occitanie, France. It is the current terminus of three lines.

France's SNCF operates TER (local) services on the Portet-Saint-Simon–Puigcerdà railway (from Toulouse-Matabiau) and on the Ligne de Cerdagne known as Train Jaune (from Villefranche-de-Conflent, with connections to Perpignan). Spain's Renfe Operadora runs Rodalies de Catalunya trains from L'Hospitalet de Llobregat on the Barcelona commuter rail line R3. SNCF also runs Intercités de Nuit night trains to Paris.

Latour-de-Carol is one of the few stations in the world with three different gauges. Others include Montreux railway station, Hendaye station and Jenbach railway station, Madrid Atocha station(when the metro is included), Powell Street and Embarcadero stations in San Francisco, and several stations in Tokyo, mostly on the Toei Shinjuku Line. The three lines each have a different voltage supply: 1500 V DC (overhead France), 3000 V DC (overhead Spain), and 850 V DC (3rd Rail, Ligne de Cerdagne), respectively.

Platform 1 also features the longest covered platform in France.

Services from Latour-de-Carol are to Toulouse, Barcelona and Villefranche-de-Conflent where one can change for Perpignan.

Train services
The following services currently call at Latour-de-Carol:
night service (Intercités de nuit) Paris–Toulouse–Pamiers–Latour-de-Carol
local service (TER Occitanie) Latour-de-Carol-Enveitg–Font-Romeu–Villefranche-Vernet-les-Bains
local service (TER Occitanie) Toulouse–Foix–Latour-de-Carol-Enveitg
local service (Rodalies de Catalunya line R3) L'Hospitalet de Llobregat–Barcelona-Sants–Vic–La Tor de Querol-Enveig

Gallery

References

External links

Spanish Railways website 
 Photos

Railway stations in Pyrénées-Orientales
Rodalies de Catalunya stations